November 13: Attack on Paris is a 2018 French docu-series by French director duo the brothers Gédéon and Jules Naudet. The film depicts the events of November 13, 2015 when six locations around the city were attacked by ISIL terrorists, killing a total of 130 people and injuring hundreds more.

Premise
November 13: Attack on Paris explores the events of November 13, 2015, when six locations around the city were attacked by ISIL terrorists, including the Stade de France and the Bataclan theatre, killing a total of 130 people and injuring hundreds more.

Politicians interviewed 
 Anne Hidalgo, Mayor of Paris
 François Hollande, former French President
 Bernard Cazeneuve, former Minister of the Interior

Release
The film was released on June 6, 2018 on Netflix streaming.

References

External links
 
 
 

2018 French television series debuts
French documentary television series
French-language Netflix original programming
November 2015 Paris attacks